Whitecliff Bay is a sandy bay near Foreland which is the easternmost point of the Isle of Wight, England, about two miles south-west of Bembridge and just to the north of Culver Down. It is a tourist site with three holiday parks in the vicinity of the bay; it has two cafes though minimal facilities. Access is limited and only possible down two steeply sloping concrete tracks.

The site is of major geological interest, being part of the Whitecliff Bay And Bembridge Ledges SSSI.

Geology

Whitecliff Bay has nearly identical geology to the lesser known Alum Bay, being a coastal section of the same strata which run east–west across the island. It displays a classic sequence of fossil-bearing Eocene beds of soft sands and clays, separated by an unconformity from the underlying Cretaceous Chalk Formation forming the headland of Culver Down to its south. Due to geological folding of the Alpine orogeny, the strata in the main section of the Bay are vertical, with younger rocks to the north.

History
Whitecliff Bay was one of the landing points for the French invasion of the Isle of Wight (1545) where they planned to go on to attack Sandown.

References

External links
Whitecliff Bay Holiday Park

Tourist attractions on the Isle of Wight
Bays of the Isle of Wight
Geology of the Isle of Wight
Bembridge